Kenneth, or Ken Thompson, or Kenny Thompson may refer to:

Kenneth Thompson (bishop) (died 1975), Bishop of Sherwood
Kenneth Thompson (ice hockey) (1895–1931), British-Canadian ice hockey centre
Kenneth P. Thompson (1966–2016), American attorney
Kenneth W. Thompson (1921–2013), American academic and author in the field of international relations
G. Kennedy Thompson (born 1950), also known as Ken Thompson, American businessman; Wachovia Corporation
Ken Thompson (footballer, born 1926) (1926–2008), English professional footballer
Ken Thompson (footballer, born 1945), English professional footballer
Ken Thompson (born 1943), American computer science pioneer
Kenan Thompson (born 1978), American actor, showman and comedian
Kenny Thompson (Bermudian footballer) (born 1955), Bermudian football manager
Kenny Thompson (born 1985), Belgian footballer
Sir Kenneth Thompson, 1st Baronet (1909–1984), British politician and businessman
 Kenneth Kwamina Thompson, Ghanaian businessman

See also
Ken Thomson (disambiguation)
Kenneth Thomson, 2nd Baron Thomson of Fleet (1923–2006), Canadian businessman